Hefei Rail Transit, also known as Hefei Metro, is a rapid transit system in Hefei, China.

Lines in operation

Line 1

Line 1 began construction on 1 June 2012 and was opened on December 26, 2016. The color of Line 1 is red.

Line 2

Line 2 opened on December 26, 2017. Thales Saic Transport is providing the line with urban rail traffic management and CBTC systems. The color of Line 2 is blue.

Line 3

Line 3 opened on December 26, 2019. The color of Line 3 is green.

Line 4

Line 4 opened on December 26, 2021, along with the section from Beiyan Lake to Qinglonggang, which is planned to be split into Line 6. The color of Line 4 is orange.

Line 5 

Line 5 opened on December 26, 2020. The color of Line 5 is chartreuse.

Future Development

2022 Plan

2025 Plan
The extensions of Lines 2, 3, 4, and the first phase of Lines 6, 7, 8 and regional line S1 are also approved.

References

External links

 Official website 
 Urbanrail.net

 
Rapid transit in China
Transport in Hefei
Railway lines opened in 2016
2016 establishments in China